The Walking Dead: The Road to Woodbury is a post-apocalyptic horror novel written by Robert Kirkman and Jay Bonansinga and released October 16, 2012. The novel is a spin-off of Kirkman's series of graphic novels and explores the back-story of one of the series' most infamous characters, Lilly Caul. The Road to Woodbury is the second in a trilogy of novels, following The Walking Dead: Rise of the Governor and preceding The Walking Dead: The Fall of the Governor (Parts I and II).

Plot
The book focuses on Lilly and her path to Woodbury, Georgia, a rural town that is barricaded and walled off to separate the living from the undead. It seems to be the perfect sanctuary. Life appears idyllic, with plenty of food, shelter and security provided to its residents. The town expands and grows stronger every day, and its leader, The Governor (Philip  Blake), keeps the citizens in line. 

Lilly begins to suspect all is not as it seems. Blake, who relishes his title as The Governor, has disturbing ideas about law and order. Lilly and a group of rebels band together to fight The Governor. Mayhem and destruction result when they challenge his reign.

Characters
Josh Lee Hamilton
Lilly Caul
Everett Ray Caul
Bob Stookey
Brenda Stookey 
Phillip Blake
Chad Bingham
Donna Bingham
Sarah Bingham
Lydia Bingham
Mary Bingham
Ruthie Bingham
Megan Lafferty
Caesar Martinez
Scott Moon
Penny Blake

Deaths
Brenda Stookey
Everett Ray Caul
Sarah Bingham
Chad Bingham
Josh Lee Hamilton
Scott Moon
Megan Lafferty
Penny Blake

Reception
The Examiner.com said:

References

2012 American novels
Road to Woodbury
Novels set in Georgia (U.S. state)
Meriwether County, Georgia
Thomas Dunne Books books